Alberto Rizzo (May 2, 1931 – October 9, 2004), was an Italian photographer and painter. He was born in La Spezia, outside of Rome.  Rizzo studied painting, design, and graphic arts at the famed Accademia delle Belle Arti di Brera, Milan. Rizzo was also trained as a classical ballet dancer in Italy and France working with great choreographers such as Maurice Bejart.  He came to America in 1960 at the invitation of Hermes Pan.  He started off his American career in California, working with Fred Astaire among others.

By 1961, Rizzo began his career as a photographer, moving to New York City in 1965.  Once in New York, he established himself as an avant garde fashion photographer and began his creative relationship with prominent art director, Bea Feitler at Harper's Bazaar.  This collaboration with Feitler resulted in Rizzo working extensively with the world's most important fashion publications.  His editorial work was published in: Harper's Bazaar, Italian Harper's Bazaar, Vogue, Italian Vogue, L'Uomo Vogue, French Vogue, Japanese Vogue, Vanity Fair, Mademoiselle, Glamour, GQ, Linea Italia, Playboy, Donna, Domus, etc.  Commercial clients included: Bloomingdale's,  Bergdorf Goodman, Saks Fifth Avenue, Armani, Chanel, Charles James, Revlon, Clinique, Max Factor, Charles of the Ritz, Helena Rubinstein, Bulgari, Piaget, Seiko, Tiffany, David Webb, etc.

Rizzo's pioneering photography received many distinguished awards throughout the late 1960s and early 1970s, including the 1969, 1970, and 1971 Art Directors Club of America Awards as well as the 1972 Coty American Fashion Critics' Award and in 1978 the Andy Award of Excellence.  In the late 1980s, Rizzo began experimenting with photoprinting on different surfaces and in 1994 he filed a patent for Photoprinting on Metal and Similar Substrates with the United States Patent Office.

His works have been featured in several photography books and publications including: Snoopy Around the World (Le Tour du Monde de Snoopy), Photographs by Alberto Rizzo and commentaries by Charles M. Schulz, published by Harry N Abrams Inc., 1990, New York Fashion, The Evolution of Style, published by Harry N Abrams Inc., 1993, Anthony Mazzola's 125 Great Moments of Harper's Bazaar, a commemorative collection of outstanding photographs, illustrations, and texts that have appeared in Harper's Bazaar, published by Hearst Communications, 1993; Diamonds, published by Harry N Abrams Inc., 1996; Tiffany in Fashion, published by Harry N Abrams Inc., 2003; Italian Eyes: Italian Fashion Photography from 1951 to Today, published by Charta/Fondazione Pitti Immagine Discovery, 2005; and more recently, David Webb The Quintessential American Jeweler, published by Assouline Publishing, 2013, and 2017, Glenda Bailey's Harper's Bazaar: 150 Years: The Greatest Moments, commemorating the magazine's most celebrated photographs, covers, articles, and works of fiction since 1867, published by Harry N. Abrams, New York.

Rizzo had one person exhibitions at prestigious galleries such as: Cyrus Gallery, New York, NY in 1990; Camera Club of New York's Alfred Lowenstein Gallery, NY in 1996; Cristina Modern Gallery, New York, NY in 1997 and 1998; Daniel Azoulay Gallery, "Alberto Rizzo: A History-Forty Years of Photography", Miami in 2002 and posthumously in 2008; and culminating with Galleria Carla Sozzani, "Invito alla Fotografia", Milan, Italy in 2003.

In addition to his personal work, Rizzo also collaborated with other artists on projects such as: "Reversible Destiny: Arakawa Gins" exhibited at the Guggenheim Museum SoHo, New York, June 25-August 31, 1997, and a collaboration with his fellow Italian, Vincenzo Agnetti, "4 Titles", Toselli Gallery, Milan, IT, the Venice Biennale, Venice, IT, in 1979, and Ronald Feldman Gallery, New York, NY, November 22 through December 1980.

A selection of his important group exhibitions include: Vogue Italia, Milan, 1984; Vogue Italia, "Fifty Years of Italian Vogue", Milan, 1985; Thread Waxing Space, "Collections in Context: Selected Contemporary Photographs from the Collection of Henry Buhl", 1996; Parrish Art Museum, "Collections in Context: Selected Contemporary Photographs from the Collection of Henry Buhl", 1997-1998; Neue Galerie Graz, "Rudi Gernreich: Fashion Will Go Out of Fashion", Graz, Austria, 2000; Galleria Carla Sozzani, "Invito al Collezionismo", Milan, Italy, 2005; Maxxi Museo de Nazionale delle arti del XXI Secolo, "Lo Sguardo Italiano/Italian Eyes", Rome, Italy, 2005; Rotonda della Besana, "Lo Sguardo Italiano/Italian Eyes", Milan, 2005; Staley Wise Gallery, "Classic French", New York, 2010; The Cartier Mansion, "Cartier and Aldo Cipullo: New York City in the 70s", New York, 2012, Victoria and Albert Museum, "La Moda: The Glamour of Italian Fashion" London, England, 2014, Victoria and Albert Museum, "A History of Photography: The Body", London, England, 2016, and Westwood Gallery, "The Language of Hands: Photographs from the Buhl Collection, New York, 2017.  Most recently, in 2017, Harper's Bazaar celebrated their 150th Anniversary's Greatest Moments by projecting their most iconic images onto the Empire State Building which included Rizzo's January 1970 cover.

In 2002, one of Rizzo's photographs was accepted into the Irene Lewisohn Costume Reference Library Collection of the Costume Institute of The Metropolitan Museum of Art, New York, NY.

In 2015, two of Rizzo's photographs were accepted into the permanent collection of the Victoria and Albert Museum, London, England.

In 2019, seven of Rizzo’s photographs were accepted into the permanent collection of The J. Paul Getty Museum, Los Angeles, California. 

In December 2019, Phillips showcased the work of Alberto Rizzo through the display of thirty-six carefully selected images in the first solo show dedicated to him in over a decade.

Alberto Rizzo's work is currently represented by Visions in Motion Production, Inc; New York, NY.

Alberto Rizzo moved to Florida at the end of his life and died in Miami, FL on October 9, 2004.

References

Sources 
http://www.conceptimages.com/rizzo/portfolio.html
http://www.thewordofgod.com/AlbertoRizzo.html
http://www.photography-now.com/artist/details/alberto-rizzo
http://www.exibart.com/profilo/eventiV2.asp/idelemento/25193
https://web.archive.org/web/20041216093441/http://danielazoulaygallery.com/alberto_rizzo/1index.html
https://web.archive.org/web/20130622024708/http://www.feldmangallery.com/pages/exhsolo/exhagn80.html

Italian photographers
Photographers from New York City
Fashion photographers
2004 deaths
1931 births
American people of Italian descent